Adam Kamani (born June 1989) is a British businessman. He is chief executive of the Kamani Property Group and KM Capital, and co-founder of PrettyLittleThing.

Kamani grew up in Chorlton. Kamani's grandfather, Abdullah Kamani, left Kenya in the 1960s and moved to the UK with his wife and four children. He studied at Cheadle Hulme school and Wilmslow High School. He went on to study international hospitality business at Sheffield Hallam University, but left after moving abroad. In 2012, Kamani co-founded Pretty Little Thing with his brother Umar Kamani which focused on the fashion accessories market. In 2017, Boohoo bought a majority stake in the business.

References

Living people
1989 births
British businesspeople of Indian descent
British people of Indian descent
British people of Gujarati descent
British Muslims
British real estate businesspeople
British retail company founders
Adam